Pyramidenkogel is an  mountain in Carinthia, Austria. It is located to the south of the Wörthersee and near the town of Maria Wörth, in an area that is a boundary between speakers of German and Slovenian. In nearby Slovenia the mountain is known as Jedvovca. The mountain has been a tourist attraction since at least the late 19th century. The view from its top is mentioned in Karl Baedeker's 1879 The Eastern Alps.

Another mountain named Pyramidenkogel can be found in Austrian Totes Gebirge mountain range. Located south-east of the Almsee, its height is 1961 m.

Structures on the mountain

First structure and cross
A wooden observation platform had been built in 1950, as was a cross to remember the dead of World War I and World War II and "victims of the mountains." The cross was consecrated on 20 August 1950. An annual "Trausteinmesse," a special Mass, is celebrated at the end of summer.

First Pyramidekogel Tower (1968-2012)
A  observation and broadcasting tower of steel and concrete, the Pyramidenkogel Tower, was built between 1966 and 1968 and was a well-known "futuristic" tourist attraction, according to the Rough Guide to Austria; Lonely Planet calls it "avant-garde." In 2008, the last summer season before construction of a new edifice, the tower welcomed the five-millionth visitor. The tower was eventually demolished on October 12, 2012.

Current Tower (2013-Present)
In July 2006, plans were made to tear down the existing tower and replace it with a new building, a multi-purpose activity centre, which was approved in 2007 and for which the Carinthian government set aside €10 million in 2008. A competition for the new design was started in 2007; the architectural firm of Klaura & Kaden won the competition. Construction was to have begun by late 2008, and the old tower was to be imploded in October 2008, but was postponed and financial and political difficulties prevented any new construction. The demolition was planned once again for September 2010 but was postponed again. The last opening day was on September 30, 2012, and the first existing tower was demolished on October 12, 2012.

The new tower, finished in 2013, was described by Dietmar Kaden as a "Himmelsleiter aus gestapelten Ellipsen," a ladder into heaven made of stacked ellipses, and is to function as a "Leuchtturm der Holzbranche," a lighthouse for the timber industry. No name has been decided on; Markus Klaura has proposed "Isis Noreia," for the goddesses Isis and Noreia (the latter a Germanic deity, the Roman equivalent of Isis).

The new tower is  built of wood and steel, and at a height of 100 metres it is the tallest wooden observation tower in the world. Architects Markus Klaura and Dietmar Kaden of Klagenfurt and structural engineer Markus Lackner of Villach have designed a structure which features a visitors platform at 83 metres, a cafe at 70 metres, and a  slide (the longest slide in Europe). The tower is PEFC-certified.

See also
List of towers

References

External links

 
 Video animation of the new wooden tower

Mountains of the Alps
Buildings and structures in Carinthia (state)
Mountains of Carinthia (state)
Tourist attractions in Carinthia (state)
Towers completed in 2013
Buildings and structures completed in 1950
Buildings and structures demolished in 2008
Towers completed in 1968